Sławomir Andrzej Paluch (born 27 November 1975) is a Polish former professional footballer who played as a midfielder. He made two appearances for the Poland national team in 1997.

References

External links
 

1975 births
Living people
People from Knurów
Polish footballers
Association football midfielders
Poland international footballers
Ekstraklasa players
Odra Wodzisław Śląski players
Ruch Chorzów players
Górnik Zabrze players
Wisła Kraków players